Lift nets, also called lever nets, are a method of fishing using nets that are submerged to a certain depth and then lifted out of the water vertically. The nets can be flat or shaped like a bag, a rectangle, a pyramid, or a cone. Lift nets can be hand-operated, boat-operated, or shore-operated. They typically use bait or a light-source as a fish-attractor. Lift nets are also sometimes called "dip nets", though that term applies more accurately to hand nets.

Lift nets are hauled out by hand or mechanically through boom(s)  and blocks. The handling (setting and hauling) of large lift nets, normally requires in addition one or several winches. The operations from the shore, from a canoe or a bigger boat includes the setting of the net at a certain depth opening facing upwards- the attraction of the fish over the above mentioned opening by light or bait, then the lifting and hauling of the net out of the water manually or mechanically.

The Target species are small pelagic species, fish and squid. 

Water Area Overview:  All over the world.

These net are active a few meters below the surface. The active gear depends on the attraction power of light when light attraction is used. This differs when lamps are above the surface either one or several, or if under water lamps are used; with the former.

Types
There are 3 main types of lift nets which can be distinguished as; Portable Hand Lift nets (Used in General, with light attraction), Shore Operated stationary Lift Nets and Boat Operated Lift net.

Portable hand lift nets
Portable hand lift nets are small lift nets operated manually (That is, the use of hand). They usually have a rigid frame which is attached to a long pole. They are used primarily to catch fish and crustaceans, and may be submerged just below the water surface or close to the bottom. A person using hand lift nets usually operate it from the shore, on bridges, and sea coast from harbor walls. The net consists of a horizontal netting panel or a bag shaped (Used with opening facing upwards).

They are dipped into and lifting from the water by means of a long pole if the hand lift nets are larger. No fishing vessel is required. After being submerged and kept a while at a certain depth(within a few meters), with the use of hand,  the net is lifted and hauled out of water. The species mainly captured are the pelagic species and this takes place in water areas all over the world.

Portable hand lift nets do not or hardly have any negative environmental impact since the overall expected catch is always very little and when a few very small or juvenile fishes are caught they can anyway be released alive.

Shore-operated stationary lift nets

Stationary lift nets are larger than hand lift nets and are attached permanently to a shore-built structure. Lifting the nets may be done by hand through the use of counterweights, or they may use mechanized winches. Bait or a strong source of light is placed in the middle of the net. They are typically placed near beaches or riverbanks.

Stationary lift nets are relatively large and are usually operated from stationary installation situated along the shore. They are operated usually from the bank of a river or a suitable beach by installing them on a special platform. The more modern lift nets, are operated with the help of hand or motor driven winches. No fishing vessel is required. After being Submerged at the required depth, the nets are lifted or hauled out of the water by the hand or mechanically. The fish are sometimes attracted by strong Light or Bait.

Stationary lift net is mostly used to capture pelagic species and in this case boats are not often required. It is operated mainly in the water surface either in sea and inland water.

Boat-operated lift nets
Boat-operated lift nets are lift nets operated from water vessels. They may be lifted up by hand or by mechanical winches. They usually utilize several long poles attached to one side of the boat or surrounding the boat. Bait or a strong source of light is used to attract the fish.

These Gear Comprise the bag net ("basnig") and the blanket net. The catching process is supported by lights depending on target species or simply some bait. Most of the target species are small pelagic species and this takes place in water areas all over the world.  This net is operated from the surface in the upper column, at sea or inland water. There is the use of a large vessel known as the Lift Netters . Boat Operated lift nets are often used in small scale fisheries from small catamans (Inland fisheries, in Africa) or two canoes operating together.

IMPACTS:  The Unexpected by catch rates, is low in general. But when lights are used, most species are often attracted than expected. (E.g Cephalopods).

See also

 Cast net
 Butterfly net
Fish aggregating device
Trawling

References
 Fishing Gear Type: Technology Fact Sheets. In: Fisheries and Aquaculture topics. [Internet] Rome: Food and Agriculture Organization of the United Nations; c2005-2011 [cited 2011 May 12]. Available from: http://www.fao.org/fishery/geartype/search/en

 Gabriel O, Lange K, Dahm E, Wendt T. Fish catching methods of the world. 4th ed. Oxford: Blackwell Publishing; 2005.

 Thiele W, Prado J. Fishing gears and methods. In: Fisheries and Aquaculture topics [Internet]. Rome: Food and Agriculture Organization of the United Nations; c2005-2011 [modified 2005 May 27; cited 2011 May 12]. Available from: http://www.fao.org/fishery/topic/1617/en

Additional Resources

 FAO – The Use of Technical Measures in Responsible Fisheries: Regulation Of Fishing Gear

 Marine Conservation Society – Fishing Methods

 http://www.fao.org/fishery/geartype/214/en

 http://www.fao.org/fishery/geartype/255/en

Fishing nets
Fishing techniques and methods